JEAN was a dialect of the JOSS programming language developed for and used on ICT 1900 series computers in the late 1960s and early 1970s; it was implemented under the MINIMOP operating system. It was used at the University of Southampton.

JEAN was an acronym derived from "JOSS Extended and Adapted for Nineteen-hundred". It was operated from a Teletype terminal.

References

ICL programming languages
JOSS programming language family